Ana Cláudia Moura Pereira (born 17 September 1979), known as Ana Moura, is a Portuguese fado singer. An internationally recognized singer, she was the youngest fadista to be nominated for a Dutch Edison Award.

Early life and career

Ana Moura was born on 17 September 1979, in Santarém, Portugal.

Ana Moura's debut album was Guarda-me a Vida na Mão (2003), followed by Aconteceu (2004). She sang in various nightspots in Lisbon and became known on television, performing fado with António Pinto Basto.

Para Além da Saudade (2007), containing songs such as "Os Buzios" or "Fado da Procura", is the album that followed Aconteceu. With this album and appearances on programs such as Family Contact and Superstar, Moura became more widely known in Portugal. These television appearances helped promote this record, which was to reach triple platinum for sales exceeding 45,000 units. The album stayed in the Top 30 in Portugal for 78 weeks. 
For this album, Moura received a nomination for the Golden Globes in the category of Music, Best Individual Performer, losing to Jorge Palma.

In 2007, Ana Moura joined the Rolling Stones in concert at the Alvalade XXI stadium in Lisbon. She sang "No Expectations" with Mick Jagger.

After two big concerts in coliseums of Porto and Lisbon, Moura launched her first live DVD on 24 November 2008, which has enjoyed great success with the public. She appeared at the World Music Institute concert.

With the recognition from critics came also the recognition of peers, and in 2008, Ana Moura received the prize for "best performance Amalia".

In 2009, the rock artist, Prince, stated he was a fan of fado, and expressed interest in collaborating musically with Ana. Prince traveled to Lisbon in July 2011.

Moura's album Leva-me aos Fados ("Take Me to a Fado House"), released on 12 October 2009 (presented at the Casa da Música – Porto Coliseum and Lisbon on 20 and 21 October) reached the Top 10 of best-selling albums, and went platinum. With songs such as "Leva-me aos Fados" (single presentation), "Caso Arrumado", "Rumo ao Sul" and "Fado Vestido de Fado" Ana Moura delighted her audience. Ana began to tour in Portugal and abroad, with concerts in northern Portugal, London, Canada, Austria and Germany. She appeared at the 2010 and 2011 San Francisco Jazz Festival. Moura sang with Italian singer Pacifico on the song "Pioggia sul mio alfabeto".

Her fifth album, Desfado, was produced by former Joni Mitchell producer Larry Klein and featured her cover of Mitchell's "A Case of You."  Released in November 2012, the album debuted at number 2 and went on to top the chart. The album topped sales in Portugal for 6 weeks, spent 117 weeks in the top 10 and 200 weeks on the entire chart, making it the all-time best-charting album in Portugal. The album was certified 6× Platinum by the Portuguese Phonographic Association and became the best-selling album of the 2010s released by a local act. Two singles from it were released, including "Até ao Verão" and the title track.

In 2015, Moura released her 6th studio album, titled Moura. Moura debuted at number 2 on the Portuguese charts and rose to the number 1 spot, remaining there for 4 weeks. It has spent a total of 168 weeks on the charts and is ranked as the 4th best-charting album of all time in Portugal.  Like Moura's previous album, it was produced by Larry Klein, and features 13 Portuguese tracks, and 1 English track—a cover of "Lilac Wine". Omara Portuondo of Buena Vista Social Club duets with Moura on "Eu Entrego".

Personal life
Her first child, a girl, was born on 4 May 2022.

Discography

Studio albums

Live albums 

 Coliseu (2008)

Video albums
Coliseu (2008)

Non-album tracks
2005: "Filha De Hervas" – Various Artists – A Tribute to Amalia Rodrigues 
2005: "De Nua" – Sara Tavares – Balance  
2008: "Brown Sugar" and "No Expectations" – Tim Ries – Stones World: The Rolling Stones Project
2010: "Saia de Carolina" – Leopoldina – Missão Sorriso  
2012: "Janelas Obertas, No. 2" – Various Artists – A Tribute to Caetano Veloso  
2012: "Pioggia Sul Mio Alfabeto" – Pacifico – Una Voce Non Basta  
2012: "Por Um Dia" – Jorge Fernando – Memória E Fado and O Nosso Fado   
2013: "Novo Fado Alegre" – Carlos do Carmo – Fado E Amor
2013: "Sabe Deus" – Idan Raichel – Quarter to Six  
2014: "Clandestinos do Amor" – Movie Soundtrack – Os Gatos Não Tem Vertigens  
2015: "Maldicão" – Various Artists – Amalia: As Vozes Do Fado  
2015: "O Recomeço: Cessar Fogo, Pt. 2" – Aldina Duarte – Romances  
2015: "Eu Seguro" – They're Heading West – They’re Heading West
2015: "E Tu Gostavas de Mim" and "Reader's Digest" – Miguel Araujo – Cidade Grande Ao Vivo no Coliseu do Porto
2017: "Manto de Água" – Agir – Manto de Água
2017: "Man Who Sold the World" – David Fonseca – Bowie 70
2018: "Não Hesitva un Segundo" – Toze Brito – A Memoria de Amor 
2019: "Dor Sem Álibi” – Pedro Abrunhosa - Espiritual
2019: "Depressa Demais" – Stereossuaro – Bairro da Ponte
2020: "Vinte Vinte" – Branko & Conan Osiris
2021: "Linda Forma de Morrer" - Pedro Mafama - Por Este Rio Abaixo
2022: "Leva o Rosario Contigo" - Rita Dias - Morremos Tanto Para Crescer
2022: "Te Amo" (Calema cover)

Album tracks on compilations (partial list)
2005: "Porque Teimas Nesta Dor" - The Best of Fado: Um Tesoura Portugues Vol. 3 
2007: "Lavava no Rio Lavava" – Saudade: Ámalia Noutras Vozes
2008: "Fado De Pessoa" – Songs of the Siren: Irresistible Voices
2008: "Até ao Fim do Fim" – A Outra (Soundtrack) 
2009: "Os Búzios" – Fado Anthologia I & II
2011: "Amor em Tons de Sol Maior" – Fado Portugal
2011: "Jardim da Saudade" – Fados e Canções do Alvim
2012: "Caso Arrumado" – Fado 
2012: "Amor em Tons de Sol Maior" – The Story of Fado
2012: "Mouraria" – New Queens of Fado
2013: "A Fadista" – Este Meu Fado
2013: "Os Búzios" – Fado Montra Nacional
2013: "A Case of You" – This is Cool! 
2014: "Amor em Tons de Sol Maior" – Best of Portugal 
2014: "E Tu Gostavas de Mim" – Fado Alegre 
2014: "Desfado" – Fado Festival De Fado De Madrid 
2015: "Os Búzios" – The Very Best of Fado: Um Tesoura Portugues 
2016: "Os Búzios" – Caixa Ribeira: Os Maiores Fadistas do Nosso Tempo  
2016: "Desfado" – The Best of Fado: Scissors Portugues Vol. 7 
2017: "Moura Encantada" and "I deliver" – NAP Festival, 2017
2018: "Manto de Agua" – No Fame (digital only)
2019: "Moura" – Siesta Festival, 2019 
2019: "A Case of You" – Herbie Hancock Songbook (digital only)

References

External links

 Official website
David Was: Ana Moura And The Future Of Fado at All Things Considered (NPR) on 2010-5-24(audio, 4:04 min.)
Ana Moura profile at World Village
 Fado: Ana Moura kicks off February American tour – New Bedford, MA – Portuguese American Journal

Portuguese fado singers
1979 births
Living people
21st-century Portuguese women singers
People from Santarém, Portugal